The University of Pennsylvania  Journal of Business Law is a scholarly journal focusing on issues of business law, corporate governance, securities regulation, capital markets regulation, the law of mergers and acquisitions, and employment law. The Journal is published four times annually by an organization of second and third year law students at the University of Pennsylvania Law School. The journal is one of six major scholarly journals at the University of Pennsylvania Law School and one of the top five most cited business law journals in the United States.

History
The Journal of Business Law is an expansion of the Journal of Labor and Employment Law, which has published focused and cutting-edge scholarship since 1997. Building upon more than a decade of successful contribution to legal academia, the Journal now also provides a forum for scholarly analysis addressing all aspects of business law. Now on its 21st Volume, the Journal has become one of the premier destinations for business-related legal scholarship. The Journal of Business Law is published in four standard issues each year.

Member selection 
Positions on the journal are filled based in part on students' grades during first year of law school and in part on students' performance during a writing competition conducted at the end of each school year. The writing competition has two major parts: an editing portion and a writing portion. During the 20-hour editing portion, contestants are required to correct a sample portion of a fake law review article. Contestants have at their disposal a copy of the Bluebook and a packet of source materials provided by the journal. During the writing portion, contestants are required to create a cohesive, thesis-driven essay using only these source materials. The sources cover a variety of topics, and the essay does not need to be law-related.

Notable citations

In 2013, the Journal was cited in an opinion by the United States Court of Appeals for the Third Circuit. The case In re K.B. Toys, 736 F.3d 247, 249 (3d Cir. 2013), cited Tally M. Wiener & Nicholas B. Malito, On the Nature of the Transferred Bankruptcy Claim, 12 U. Pa. J. Bus. L. 35 (2009).

In 2012, the Journal was cited by both the Delaware Supreme Court and the Maine Supreme Judicial Court. In PHL Variable Ins. Co. v. Price Dawe 2006 Ins. Trust, ex rel. Christiana Bank and Trust Co., 28 A.3d 1059, 1069 n.27, 1070 n.33 (Del. 2012), the Delaware Supreme Court twice cited Susan Lord Martin, Betting on the Lives of Strangers: Life Settlements, STOLI and Securitization, 134 U. Pa. J. Bus. L. 173 (2010). In Fuhrmann v. Staples Office Superstore East, Inc., 58 A.3d 1083, 1095 (Me. 2012), the Maine Supreme Judicial Court cited Mitchell H. Rubinstein, Employees, Employers, and Quasi–Employers: An Analysis of Employees and Employers Who Operate in the Borderland Between an Employer–and–Employee Relationship, 14 U. Pa. J. Bus. L. 605 (2012).

In addition, the Journal has been regularly cited in briefs before the United States Supreme Court in some of the most important business law cases in the last decade, including:  Harris v. Quinn, Halliburton v. Erica P. John Fund (Halliburton II), Petrella v. Metro Goldwyn-Mayer, Inc., Amgen Inc. v. Connecticut Retirement Plans & Trust Funds, and Morrison v. National Australia Bank.

Volume 20 (2017-2018) Masthead

References

External links
University of Pennsylvania Journal of Business Law Web site

Labour law journals
1997 establishments in Pennsylvania
Publications established in 1997
Business law journals
Law journals edited by students
American law journals
Quarterly journals